Manzoor Ahmad Dar (born 1 November 1993) is an Indian cricketer. He made his Twenty20 debut for Jammu and Kashmir in the 2016–17 Inter State Twenty-20 Tournament on 30 January 2017. He made his List A debut for Jammu & Kashmir in the 2016–17 Vijay Hazare Trophy on 25 February 2017. In January 2018, he was bought by the Kings XI Punjab in the 2018 IPL auction.

Early life
He worked as a security guard at a Srinagar Automobile Showroom for over four years to support his family.

References

External links
 

1993 births
Living people
Indian cricketers
Jammu and Kashmir cricketers
People from Bandipore district